Xianzu is the atonal romanization of several Chinese temple names. It may refer to:

Emperor Xianwen of Northern Wei (454–476)
Emperor Wenxuan of Northern Qi (526–559)
Li Guochang (died 887), Shatuo Turk chieftain, honored as Xianzu during the Later Tang dynasty 
Suike ( late 10th or early 11th century), Jurchen chieftain, honored as Xianzu during the Jin dynasty
Taksi (1543–1583), Jurchen chieftain, honored as Xianzu during the Qing dynasty

Temple name disambiguation pages